Rachel Wyse (born 22 January 1985 in Dublin) is an Irish journalist, presenter, former Sky Sports News anchor and equestrian show jumper.

Early life
Rachel attended St Andrew's College, Dublin. 
Wyse graduated from the Institute of Art, Design and Technology in Dún Laoghaire with a degree in Business Studies and Arts Management.

Television career
Wyse eventually moved into television, producing and presenting her own entertainment and cultural programme on the City Channel.

She moved into sports presenting with the Show Jumping Ireland Premier Series in 2008 & 2009 on Sky Sports, Horse & Country TV and TG4, and was the face of Leinster Rugby's online television channel Leinster Rugby TV.

Wyse then became a co-presenter on Ireland's only domestic motoring showXccelerate on 3E.

In July 2010, Wyse was offered a contract with Sky Sports News and made her first appearance on the channel the same month. She now works full-time as a Sky Sports News Anchor. Wyse has filmed special reports with Olympic boxer Katie Taylor, Irish international rugby player Brian O'Driscoll and Manchester United player Juan Mata, as well as reporting from the London Olympics 2012 and Wimbledon.

In May 2014, Wyse was announced as a presenter of Sky Sports's new coverage of Gaelic games. Sky purchased the broadcasting rights for Championship football and hurling from the GAA.

Wyse parted company with Sky Sports in February 2021, after eleven years.

Personal life
Rachel became engaged to showjumper Tim Gredley on 5 February 2018.
They were married on 12 January 2019 with a reception at Adare Manor in  Co Limerick.

On 8 March 2020, Wyse announced she and her husband Tim Gredley were expecting their first child. On 24 July 2020, Wyse gave birth to a baby girl called Isabella.

Rachel and husband Tim welcomed their second child, a daughter named Charlotte in December 2021. The new arrival was pictured on Wyse’s Instagram account on Christmas Day 2021.

Sports career
She competed internationally for Ireland as part of two European Showjumping Championships teams and has competed on the Irish National circuit.

On St. Patrick's Day 2011, Wyse rode Silent Jo at Cheltenham in the charity race for Cancer Research UK. She raised more than £60,000 for the charity. She was invited to the House of Lords to receive recognition as one of Cancer Research UK's top fundraisers in 2011.

Wyse has a Saturday column in the Irish Independent, WYSE ON SPORT, which contains opinion pieces covering all sports.

References

External links
 Rachel Wyse at TV Newsroom
 Sky Sports News Special Report Juan Mata 
 Interviewing GB Bronze medal Winning team http://www1.skysports.com/watch/video/7952048/historic-bronze-for-gb-men

1985 births
Living people
Gaelic games writers and broadcasters
Irish columnists
Irish female equestrians
Irish show jumping riders
Irish sports broadcasters
Sky Sports presenters and reporters
Sportspeople from Dún Laoghaire–Rathdown
Television presenters from the Republic of Ireland
People educated at St Andrew's College, Dublin
Alumni of IADT
Irish women columnists